The DRDO Smart Anti-Airfield Weapon (SAAW) is a long-range precision-guided anti-airfield weapon developed by India's Defence Research and Development Organisation (DRDO).

The SAAW project was approved by the Government of India in 2013. The first successful test of the weapon was conducted in May 2016. Another successful test was conducted in November of the following year. This was followed by a series of three successful tests in December 2017.

Between 16 and 18 August 2018, three successful tests were conducted, which brought the total number of tests to eight.

In September 2020, the SAAW was approved for procurement by the Indian Government for the Navy and the Air Force.

Description 
The SAAW has been developed by the Research Centre Imarat (RCI), and other DRDO laboratories in collaboration with the Indian Air Force. It is a lightweight, high precision guided bomb designed to destroy ground targets, such as runways, bunkers, aircraft hangars and other reinforced structures. It is India's first fully indigenous anti-airfield weapon, designed and developed wholly by the DRDO.

According to DRDO chief S. Christopher, unlike normal bombs in the Indian inventory which are sensitive to environmental conditions and therefore may not precisely hit the intended target, the precision-guided SAAW has higher precision and can precisely hit the intended target. According to him, "This is a sort of guided bomb and it will be much much cheaper than a missile or rocket, the reason being that it is not having a propulsion, it is making use of the aircraft's propulsion. It can go and land in a place we want."

The SAAW can currently be launched from the Jaguar and Su-30MKI aircraft. The Su-30MKI is capable of carrying 20-32 SAAW by using indigenous four-round Smart Quad Rack system under its pylon. There are plans to integrate the weapon with the Dassault Rafale and HAL Tejas MK1A when it is inducted into the Indian Air Force.

Development and trials 
The project finds mention in a written note submitted by the Ministry of Defence (MoD) to the Standing Committee on Defence, in a report on 'Demands for Grants' to be provided in 2014–15 to the Ordnance Factories Board and the DRDO. It is also listed in the list of current programmes of the Mission and Combat System R&D Center (MCSRDC) of Hindustan Aeronautics Limited (HAL).

Trials for the wing functioning of the weapon were successfully conducted in late 2015 at the Rail Track Rocket Sled (RTRS) facility located at the Terminal Ballistics Research Laboratory (TBRL), Ramgarh, Haryana.

According to plans, the weapon was to be tested by the beginning of May 2016 in Jaisalmer. However, owing to technical reasons, the test had to be aborted twice. The weapon was finally tested at the end of the first week of May 2016 by the Aircraft and Systems Testing Establishment (ASTE) of the IAF from a Jaguar DARIN II aircraft in Bengaluru, and the test was successful.

A second test of the weapon was successfully conducted on 24 December 2016 by the DRDO from a Su-30MKI aircraft at the Integrated Test Range (ITR) at Chandipur, Odisha. It included captive flight and release tests which were tracked by radar and telemetry ground stations at the ITR throughout the flight duration.

On 3 November 2017, a series of three tests were successfully conducted from an Indian Air Force aircraft at the ITR at Chandipur, Odisha. The bomb, upon release from the aircraft, was guided by an on-board precision navigation system and reached the targets at a range of more than 70 kilometers with high accuracy. According to a statement by the MoD, the tests were conducted with different release conditions and ranges. The statement also cited DRDO chief S. Christopher as saying that the weapon will soon be inducted into service.

On 19 August 2018, the MoD announced through a press release that a total of three tests were successfully conducted from a Jaguar aircraft between 16 and 18 August 2018 at the Chandan range in Pokhran, Rajasthan, thus bringing the total number of tests to eight. During the tests, the SAAW, fitted with a live warhead, destroyed the intended targets with high precision. The press statement further said that all the mission objectives were achieved, adding that the tests were witnessed by senior officials from the DRDO, HAL and the IAF.

On 21 January 2021, India successfully test fired SAAW from the Hawk-i aircraft off the coast of Odisha. On 28 October 2021, IAF tested SAAW at Pokhran range from Su-30MKI in dual rack pylon configuration.

On 3rd November 2021, DRDO and IAF tested SAAW with electro optical seeker, first of its class in India.

Production 
On 15 December 2021, Minister of Defence Rajnath Singh handed over SAAW to IAF Chief Vivek Ram Chaudhari clearing way towards mass production.

Future Development
DRDO chairman Dr G. Satheesh Reddy has disclosed that the next version of SAAW will be equipped with an IIR seeker and will begin developmental trials in 2022.

See also 
Matra Durandal– French anti-runway weapon
JP233 – British submunitions system
 BAP 100 - French anti-runway cluster bomb
 Anti-runway penetration bomb - Type of weapons
DRDO Glide Bombs
Sudarshan laser-guided bomb

References

External links 

Defence Research and Development Organisation
Aerial bombs of India
Anti-runway weapons

Technical:
 DRDO Technology Focus : Warhead for Missiles, Torpedoes and Rockets